is a Japanese actor.

Filmography

Films 

 Childhood Days (1990) - Shinji Kazama
 Fukuzawa Yukichi (1991)
 The River with No Bridge (1992) - Young Koji Hatanaka
 Anmonaito no sasayaki wo kiita (1992)
 Tōki Rakujitsu (1992) - Young Hideyo Noguchi
 Oshie to tabi suru otoko (1994)
 Noroime (2000)
 Drug (2001) - Kentaro Odajima
 Kusa no ran (2004) - Naekichi Ohno

Television drama 

 O botchama ni hawa karumai! (1986)
 Nobunaga, King of Zipangu (1992)
 Fūrinkazan (1992) - Takeda Katsuyori
 Mito Kōmon - Jiro (episode 14, 1993), Kazuma Takeuchi (episode 39, 1995), Shinbei Ichihara (episode 12, 2005)
 HAMIDEKA - Makoto Otaki (episode 2, 1997)
 Abarenbō Shōgun VIII - Usaburō (episode 15, 1998)
 Hagure keiji junjō-ha (2000) - Kazuhiro Nakanishi
 Kochira dai san shakai-bu (2001) - Yoshitaka Saito
 Hagure keiji junjō-ha: Part 16 (2003) - Uehara (episode 15)
 Kochira Hon Ikegami Sho (2004) - Hayato Hayashi
 Hagure keiji junjō-ha (2004) - Yutaka Ogata

Dubbing 

 The Goonies (1985) - Ricky One
 Oliver & Company (1988) - Oliver

References 

Living people
1978 births